James Langtry may refer to:

 James I. Langtry (born 1939), government official and educator
 J. M. Langtry (James MacKay Langtry, 1894–1971), British engineer